Deroxena conioleuca is a moth in the family Autostichidae. It was described by Edward Meyrick in 1926. It is found in Kazakhstan (Uralsk).

The wingspan is 14–16 mm. The forewings are ochreous whitish irrorated (sprinkled) with fuscous. The discal stigmata are cloudy, fuscous, with a more or less clear ochreous-whitish streak connecting them. The hindwings are white, the veins on the posterior half and terminal edge greyish.

References

Moths described in 1926
Autostichinae